Viscount of Melgum was a title in the Peerage of Scotland. It was created in 1627 for Lord John Gordon, second son of George Gordon, 1st Marquess of Huntly and Henrietta Stewart (see the Marquess of Huntly for earlier history of the family). He was made Lord Aboyne at the same time, also in the Peerage of Scotland. Lord Melgum had no male issue and the titles became extinct on his death in 1630.

Viscounts of Melgum (1627)
John Gordon, 1st Viscount of Melgum (d. 1630), married Sophia Hay. He died at the fire at Frendraught Castle. His daughter was Henrietta Gordon.

See also
Marquess of Huntly
Earl of Aboyne
Viscount Aboyne

References

www.thepeerage.com

Extinct viscountcies in the Peerage of Scotland
Noble titles created in 1627